

Participating teams

Groups formed

Group A
 
 
 
 

Group B
 
 
 
 

Group C
 
 
 
 

Group D

Preliminary round

Group A

 5 January 1991

 6 January 1991

 7 January 1991

Group B

 5 January 1991

 6 January 1991

 7 January 1991

Group C

 5 January 1991

 6 January 1991

 7 January 1991

Group D

 5 January 1991

 6 January 1991

 7 January 1991

Second round

Group E

Preliminary round results apply.

 9 January 1991

 10 January 1991

Group F

Preliminary round results apply.

 9 January 1991

 10 January 1991

Group G

Preliminary round results apply.

 9 January 1991

 10 January 1991

Group H

Preliminary round results apply.

 January 9, 1991

 January 10, 1991

Final round

13th – 16th places (Group L)

Results of previous rounds apply.

 12 January 1991

 13 January 1991

9th – 12th places (Group K)

Results of previous rounds apply.

 12 September 1991

 13 September 1991

5th – 8th places (Group J)

Results of previous rounds apply.

 12 September 1991

 13 September 1991

Semi finals
12 January 1991

Finals
13 January 1991 –  Bronze Medal Match

13 January 1991 –  Gold Medal Match

Final ranking

Medalists

References

External links
 6th FINA World Championships 1991, Perth - Water polo Men's Tournament www.fina.org
 Men Water Polo World Championship 1991 Perth www.todor66.com

1991
Men